Claudio Camin (born 4 March 1970) is an Italian former racing cyclist. He rode in the 1996 Tour de France and the 1997 Vuelta a España.

Major results
1987
 2nd Trofeo Guido Dorigo
1990
 2nd Trofeo Papà Cervi
1991
 1st Circuito del Porto
1994
 3rd Trofeo Zsšdi
1995
 1st Stage 4 Girobio
 3rd Gran Premio della Liberazione
1996
 3rd GP Citta di Rio Saliceto e Correggio
1997
 4th Paris–Tours
 7th Overall Giro di Puglia

References

External links
 

1970 births
Living people
Italian male cyclists
Sportspeople from Bolzano
Cyclists from Trentino-Alto Adige/Südtirol